Lieutenant General Robert J. "Bob" Elder Jr. (born October 15, 1952) is the former Commander, 8th Air Force; Commander, Barksdale Air Force Base, Louisiana; and Commander, Joint Functional Component Command for Space and Global Strike, U.S. Strategic Command, Offutt AFB, Nebraska. He is now a member of the research faculty at George Mason University. As one of three active-duty numbered air forces in Air Combat Command, 8th Air Force provides long-range global strike, battle management, surveillance and reconnaissance, intelligence, information operations, tactical air control, and expeditionary heavy construction capabilities to combatant commanders. The "Mighty Eighth" also conducted computer network operations as the Air Force component to the Joint Task Force for Global Network Operations before that duty was transferred to 24th Air Force, and trains Air and Space Operations Center personnel for worldwide deployment and participation in the multinational Joint Expeditionary Force Experiment.

As the Joint Functional Component Commander for Space and Global Strike, General Elder serves as the lead integrator for USSTRATCOM crisis action planning, conducts global strike planning to deliver rapid, extended range, kinetic and non-kinetic effects in support of theater and national objectives, and provides situational awareness and integrated analysis of global mission capabilities for all STRATCOM operational responsibilities. General Elder also commands Task Force 204, which is responsible for monitoring all nuclear bomber, reconnaissance, and cruise missile generation operations. The Task Force 204 battlestaff is a cross-functional team that manages the generation, sustainment, logistics, security and safety of more than 100 B-2, B-52 Stratofortress, U-2, EP-3 and RC-135 aircraft at seven bases.

Biography

Education 
1970 University of Detroit Jesuit High School, Michigan
1975 Bachelor's degree in electrical engineering, University of Detroit, Michigan
1975 Master's degree in engineering, University of Detroit, Michigan
1979 Squadron Officer School, by correspondence
1985 Doctor of Engineering, University of Detroit, Michigan
1987 Distinguished graduate, Air Command and Staff College, Maxwell AFB, Alabama
1989 Air War College, by seminar
1991 National War College, Fort Lesley J. McNair, Washington, D.C.
1997 Senior Executive Program, Columbia University Graduate School of Business, New York, N.Y.
2001 Senior Executive Course, George C. Marshall College of International and Security Studies, Garmisch, Germany
2002 Combined Force Air Component Commander Course, Maxwell AFB, Alabama
2005 Joint Flag Officer Warfighting Course, Maxwell AFB, Alabama
2005 Systems Acquisition Management for General/Flag Officers Course, Fort Belvoir, Virginia
2006 Pinnacle Course, National Defense University, Fort Lesley J. McNair, Washington, D.C.

Assignments
 May 1976, student, undergraduate pilot training, Reese Air Force Base, Texas
 May 1977, student, B-52G combat crew training, Castle Air Force Base, California
 November 1977, B-52G co-pilot, 28th Bombardment Squadron, Robins Air Force Base, Georgia
 December 1980, Program Manager, F-15 Avionics Integration Support Facility, Warner Robins Air Logistics Center, Robins AFB, Georgia
 October 1982, Global Positioning System Program officer, Air Staff Training Program, Headquarters U.S. Air Force, Washington, D.C.
 April 1983, Requirements Program officer, Air Staff Training Program, Headquarters U.S. Air Force, Washington, D.C.
 September 1983, student, B-52G combat crew training, Castle AFB, California
 April 1984, B-52G flight commander, instructor pilot, 69th Bombardment Squadron, Loring Air Force Base, Maine
 August 1985, chief, B-52 Standardization and Evaluation Division, 42nd Bombardment Wing, Loring AFB, Maine
 August 1986, student, Air Command and Staff College, Maxwell Air Force Base, Alabama
 June 1987, executive officer to the Commander, Headquarters 8th Air Force, Barksdale AFB, Louisiana
 September 1988, commander, 596th Bombardment Squadron, Barksdale AFB, Louisiana
 July 1990, student, National War College, Fort Lesley J. McNair, Washington, D.C.
 June 1991, chief, Strategic and Space Forces Branch, later, Chief, Forces Division, Directorate for Force Structure, Resources and Assessment, the Joint Staff, Washington, D.C.
 July 1993, commander, 5th Operations Group, Minot Air Force Base, North Dakota
 December 1994, director, Chief of Staff Operations Group, Headquarters U.S. Air Force, Washington, D.C.
 August 1996, commander, 5th Bomb Wing, Minot AFB, North Dakota
 July 1998, assistant director of aerospace operations, Headquarters Air Combat Command, Langley Air Force Base, Virginia
 April 2000, deputy director, NATO Reaction Force Air Staff, Allied Command Europe, Kalkar, Germany
 October 2001, vice commander, 9th Air Force, and Deputy Commander, U.S. Central Command Air Forces, Shaw Air Force Base, South Carolina
 June 2003, commander, CENTAF-Forward Combined Air Headquarters; Deputy Commander, 9th Aerospace Expeditionary Task Force; and Deputy Combined Forces Air Component Commander, USCENTCOM, Southwest Asia
 July 2004, commandant, Air War College, and Vice Commander, Air University, Maxwell AFB, Alabama
 June 2006, commander, 8th Air Force; Commander, Air Force Network Operations, Barksdale AFB, Louisiana; and Joint Functional Component Commander for Space and Global Strike, U.S. Strategic Command, Offutt AFB, Nebraska
 July 2009, retired.

Flight information
Rating: Command pilot
Flight hours: More than 4,000
Combat hours: 83 (Operations Enduring Freedom and Iraqi Freedom)
Aircraft flown: E-8 Joint STARS, B-52 Stratofortress, T-38 and T-37

Awards/Decorations
  Defense Superior Service Medal with two oak leaf clusters
  Legion of Merit with oak leaf cluster
  Bronze Star
  Meritorious Service Medal with two oak leaf clusters
  Air Force Commendation Medal with oak leaf cluster
  Air Force Achievement Medal

Promotions
 Second lieutenant May 10, 1975
 First lieutenant December 4, 1977
 Captain December 1, 1979
 Major August 1, 1984
 Lieutenant colonel July 1, 1988
 Colonel January 1, 1992
 Brigadier general January 1, 2000
 Major general October 1, 2003
 Lieutenant general June 13, 2006

Works

Published works
"Non-Invasive Assessment of Pilot Workload with Flight Computer Generated Primary Measures," doctoral dissertation, University Microfilm International, 1985
"A Strategic Approach to Advanced Technology Trade with the Soviet Union," Comparative Strategy, January–March 1992

See also
Joint Functional Component Command for Space and Global Strike

References

External links

Bob Elder Interview

1952 births
Living people
United States Air Force generals
Recipients of the Legion of Merit
United States Air Force personnel of the Iraq War
United States Air Force personnel of the War in Afghanistan (2001–2021)
Columbia Business School alumni
University of Detroit Mercy alumni
Recipients of the Defense Superior Service Medal
University of Detroit Jesuit High School and Academy alumni